Magnetone was a brand of Maton Guitars under which their first electric guitars and guitar amplifiers were sold.

The brand was discontinued in the 1960s, and all subsequent Maton instruments were simply branded Maton.

See also

List of electric guitar brands

References

Guitar amplifier manufacturers
Audio equipment manufacturers of Australia
Musical instrument manufacturing companies of Australia